Yves Préfontaine (1 February 1937 in Montreal, Quebec – 31 March 2019) was a Canadian writer based in Quebec.

Books

 Boreal (1967)
 Les Temples effondres (1957)
 La Poesie et nous (1958)
 L'Antre du poeme (1960)
 Pays sans parole (1967)
 Debacle suivi de A l'oree des travaux (1970)
 Nuaison (1981)

Honors

 1968 – Prix Jean-Hamelin, The wordless
 1990 – Prix Québec-Paris, Word required, poems 1954–1985
 2000 – Félix-Antoine Savard

External links
 Dictionary of Literary Biography, Volume 53: Canadian Writers Since 1960, Page 323
 Yves Prefontaine entry in the Dictionary of Literary Biography

References

1937 births
Canadian poets in French
2019 deaths
French Quebecers
Writers from Montreal
20th-century Canadian poets
Canadian male poets
20th-century Canadian male writers